Captain Ebenezer Battle, also known as Ebenezer Battelle, represented Dedham, Massachusetts in the Great and General Court. He was also a selectman in 1779. Battle fought the retreating British soldiers following the battles of Lexington and Concord. One of his men, Elias Haven, died at  Menotomy. After the fighting ended, his men walked the entire length of the battlefield, collecting weapons and burying the dead.

He had one son, Ebenezer Battelle. He was described as "one of the industrious honest yeomanry of the good old bay state who duly appreciated the value of learning."

References

Works cited

Members of the Massachusetts General Court
Year of birth missing
Year of death missing
Dedham, Massachusetts selectmen
Military personnel from Dedham, Massachusetts
People from colonial Dedham, Massachusetts